Kotlarz is a surname. Notable people with the surname include:

 Joe Kotlarz (born 1956), American lawyer and politician
 Roman Kotlarz (1928–1976), Polish Catholic priest and activist

Polish-language surnames